Yousuf Khan Mostashar al-Dowleh (1823–1895) was an Iranian writer, intellectual and diplomat. Mostashar al-Dowleh is best known for his treatise "A Word", which was known as one of the most secular treatises in Qajar Iran. Together with Mirza Malkam Khan, he was one of the first to spread liberal ideas in Iran. He was eventually imprisoned for his views during the reign of Nasser al-Din Shah and died three years later.

Life 
Mirza Yusuf Khan was born in the city of Tabriz of an aristocratic family. Mostashar al-Dowleh was the consul general of Iran in Tbilisi from 1864 to 1867. At the same time, he corresponded with Mirza Fatali Akhundov, and with the help of Akhundov's ideas, Mostashar al-Dowleh wrote the treatise "Yusuf's Code". At the end of 1867, he was appointed as the Paris Chargé d'affaires, and according to his writings, he observed the Exposition Universelle and considered it "beautiful". At the same time he became a member of the Grand Orian Masonic Lodge. Mostashar al-Dowleh completed the famous treatise "A Word" in Paris in the last months of his service there and showed it to Akhundov on the way back to Iran in 1870 in Tbilisi. This treatise was published in 1874 in Iran. In 1882, when Mirza Yahya Mushir al-Dawla came to the Ministry of Justice, he appointed him as his deputy and issued the title of Mostashar al-Dowleh after him, but he resigned from the judiciary due to extortion and corruption in the judiciary. At that time, the Akhtar Istanbul newspaper published criticisms of the Iranian courts, and on the suspicion that he was involved in publishing those criticisms, he was accused and dismissed by the order of Nasser al-Din Shah and sentenced to five months in prison.

In 1889, Mostashar al-Dowleh, who was an agent in Azerbaijan, wrote a detailed letter to Crown Prince Muzaffar al-Din Mirza through Hassan Ali Khan Grossi, the governor of Azerbaijan, asking them to pass it on to the Shah. In that letter, he called for authoritarian rule and corruption in the court of criticism and state reform, the establishment of the rule of law, and the establishment of freedom and equality. After his letter reached Nasser al-Din Shah, he was imprisoned on the Shah's orders. Mostashar al-Dowleh was imprisoned for the second time. He was sentenced to life imprisonment and so tortured that he died three years later in 1895 in prison. After the Constitutional Revolution, he rose to prominence as an intellectual among the educated class. Writers later wrote about him, calling him one of the first Iranian libertarian and modernist writers.

Bibliography 

 Yusuf's Code, Based on his correspondence with Akhundov
 Treatise on the necessity of reforming the script of Islam
 Purple booklet, In order to build a railway in Iran
 A Word

References

Further reading 
 

Ambassadors of Iran to France

Writers from Tabriz
1823 births
1895 deaths
19th-century Iranian writers
People of Qajar Iran
19th-century Iranian politicians